Garra buettikeri is a species of ray-finned fish in the genus Garra. It is endemic to Saudi Arabia.

References 

Garra
Fish described in 1983